is the Japanese dialect of Kagawa Prefecture on the island of Shikoku.

References 

Japanese dialects